Leonid Makhnovets (1919–1993) was a Ukrainian literary critic, historian, archaeologist, interpreter, bibliographer. He was a Doctor of Philological Sciences (1966) and a recipient of the Shevchenko National Prize (1990) for preparation and publishing "Chronicle Ruthenian" (based on Hypatian Codex).

Makhnovets was born on May 31, 1919, in village Ozera, Kiev Governorate, Ukrainian People's Republic (today Bucha Raion, Kyiv Oblast).

After the fourth year at philology faculty of Kiev University, Makhnovets went to war (World War II) therefore he graduated it in 1947. After that Makhnovets entered doctorate at the Shevchenko Institute of Literature (National Academy of Sciences of Ukraine) graduating in 1950.

In 1950–1955 he was a researcher at the Shevchenko State Museum, in 1955–72 Makhnovets worked in the Shevchenko Institute of Literature (National Academy of Sciences of Ukraine) from where he was groundlessly fired. Only an invitation to work at the Harvard University forced the Soviet government of Ukraine allowed him to return to scientific research. In 1975-85 Makhnovets worked as a researcher at the Institute of archaeology (National Academy of Sciences of Ukraine).

He researched history of literature and culture of Ukraine, including the period of Kievan Rus. Makhnovtsev translated and commented The Tale of Igor's Campaign (1970) and the Chronicle Ruthenian after Hypatian Codex (1990), created several detailed indices.

Makhnovtsev is an author and coauthor of 400 works, compiler and editor of publications of Shevchenko Institute of Literature.

Makhnovets died on January 19, 1993, in Kyiv, Ukraine.

External links
 Chronicle Ruthenian after Hypatian Codex (Izbornik)
 Makhnovets, L., Myshanych, O. At the dawn of Ukrainian literature. (Izbornik)

1919 births
1993 deaths
People from Kyiv Oblast
People from Kiev Governorate
Ukrainian literary historians
20th-century Ukrainian historians
Ukrainian archaeologists
Ukrainian translators
Ukrainian people of World War II
Taras Shevchenko National University of Kyiv alumni
Recipients of the Shevchenko National Prize
Soviet translators
Soviet historians
Soviet archaeologists